The Archimedeans are the mathematical society of the University of Cambridge, founded in 1935. It currently has over 2000 active members, many of them alumni, making it one of the largest student societies in Cambridge. The society hosts regular talks at the Centre for Mathematical Sciences, including in the past by many well-known speakers in the field of mathematics. It publishes two magazines, Eureka and QARCH.

One of several aims of the society, as laid down in its constitution, is to encourage co-operation between the existing mathematical societies of individual Cambridge colleges, which at present are just the Adam's society of St John's College and the Trinity Mathematical Society, but in the past have included many more.

The society is mentioned in G. H. Hardy's essay A Mathematician's Apology.

Past presidents of The Archimedeans include Michael Atiyah and Richard Taylor.

Activity 
The main focus of the society's activities are the regular talks, which generally concern topics from mathematics or theoretical physics, and are accessible to students on an undergraduate level. Among the list of recent speakers are Fields medalists Michael Atiyah, Wendelin Werner and Alain Connes, as well as authors Ian Stewart and Simon Singh. Many of the speakers are international, and are hosted by The Archimedeans during their visit.

After exams and University-wide project deadlines, the society is also known to organise social events.

Publications 
Eureka is a mathematical journal that is published annually by The Archimedeans. It includes articles on a variety of topics in mathematics, written by students and academics from all over the world, as well as a short summary of the activities of the society, problem sets, puzzles, artwork and book reviews. The magazine has been published 65 times since 1939, and authors include many famous mathematicians and scientists such as Paul Erdős, Martin Gardner, Douglas Hofstadter, Godfrey Hardy, Béla Bollobás, John Conway, Stephen Hawking, Roger Penrose, Ian Stewart, Chris Budd, Fields Medallist Timothy Gowers and Nobel laureate Paul Dirac. It can also be read on Mathigon.

The journal is distributed free of charge to all current members of the Archimedeans. In addition, there are many subscriptions by other students, alumni and libraries. Subscriptions to Eureka are the society's main source of income.

The Archimedeans also publish QARCH, a magazine containing problem sets and solutions or partial solutions submitted by readers. It is published on an irregular basis and distributed free of charge.

References 

Mathematics in the United Kingdom
Clubs and societies of the University of Cambridge
Student organizations established in 1935